The 2014–15 Delaware State Hornets men's basketball team represented Delaware State University during the 2014–15 NCAA Division I men's basketball season. The Hornets, led by first year head coach Keith Walker, played their home games at Memorial Hall and were members of the Mid-Eastern Athletic Conference. They finished the season 18–18, 9–7 in MEAC play to finish in fifth place. They advanced to the championship game of the MEAC tournament where they lost to Hampton. They were invited to the College Basketball Invitational where they lost in the first round to Radford.

In a 104–92 win over Coppin State on March 5, center Kendall Gray scored 33 points and had 30 rebounds. He was the first NCAA Division I player to get 30 rebounds in a game since December 14, 2005.

Roster

Schedule

|-
!colspan=9 style="background:#FF0000; color:#9BDDFF;"| Regular season

|-
!colspan=9 style="background:#FF0000; color:#9BDDFF;"| MEAC tournament

|-
!colspan=9 style="background:#FF0000; color:#9BDDFF;"| College Basketball Invitational

References

Delaware State Hornets men's basketball seasons
Delaware State
Delaware State Hornets men's basketball
Delaware State Hornets men's basketball
Delaware State